The General People's Congress (Mu'tammar al-sha'ab al 'âmm), often abbreviated as the GPC, was the national legislature of Libya, during the existence of Muammar Gaddafi's Libyan Arab Jamahiriya. It consisted of 2,700 representatives of the Basic People's Congresses (BPC). The GPC was the legislative forum that interacted with the General People's Committee (GPCO), whose members are secretaries of Libyan ministries. It notionally served as the intermediary between the masses and the leadership and was composed of the secretariats of some 600 local "basic popular congresses."

The GPC secretariat and the cabinet secretaries were appointed by the GPC secretary general and confirmed by the annual GPC session. These cabinet secretaries were responsible for the routine operation of their ministries.

The body was established in 1977, upon adoption of the "Declaration on the Establishment of the Authority of the People". It was headed by the Secretary-General of the General People's Congress.

The People's Hall in Tripoli, where the Congress met, was set on fire in February 2011, during the First Libyan Civil War.

See also 
 Basic People's Congress (administrative division)
 Direct democracy

References

External links 
 

Government of Libya
Political history of Libya
Libya
Libya
History of Libya under Muammar Gaddafi
1977 establishments in Libya
2011 disestablishments in Libya